This is a list of Private Passions episodes from 2020 to present. It does not include repeated episodes or compilations.

2020

2021

References

External links

Lists of British radio series episodes